Murthwaite Halt railway station is a small intermediate railway station on the 15" gauge Ravenglass & Eskdale Railway in Cumbria, England. It is named after the (now ruined) farm that stood in the field opposite the railway. The railway serviced the Murthwaite stone crushing plant, built in the 1920s to crush granite from the quarries further up the railway's valley. This was in operation from the 1920s until 1953, and between 1929 and 1953 there was a standard gauge branch from Ravenglass to the crushing plant, the rails being gauntletted either side of the 15" gauge ones.

Accessibility 
Due to Murthwaite Halt being on a public footpath, which is not, in any way, suitable for wheelchair users, wheelchair users are not permitted to alight at this halt.

References 

Heritage railway stations in Cumbria
Ravenglass and Eskdale Railway